HMS Blackwood was the name ship of her class (also known as the Type 14-class frigate) of second-rate anti-submarine frigates built for the Royal Navy in the 1950s.

Description
The ships were powered by one English Electric geared steam turbine that drove the single propeller shaft, using steam provided by two Babcock & Wilcox boilers. Their complement was 140 officers and ratings.

The ships were armed with three Bofors 40 mm guns in single mounts. The mount on the quarterdeck was later removed as it was unusable in heavy seas. The first four ships to be completed, including Blackwood, were fitted with two above-water twin mounts for  anti-submarine homing torpedoes, but these were removed in the early 1960s. They were equipped with two triple-barrelled Limbo Mark 10 anti-submarine mortars. The Blackwood-class ships had the same sonar suite as the larger s where the Limbo mortars were controlled by three sonars, the Type 174 search set, Type 162 target-classification set and the Type 170 'pencil beam' targeting set to determine the bearing and depth of the target.

Notes

Bibliography

 

 

Blackwood-class frigates
1955 ships
Ships built by John I. Thornycroft & Company